Fox One is an Australian subscription television channel that focuses on dramas. The channel launched on 7 November 2019.

References

External links
 Foxtel Website

2019 establishments in Australia
English-language television stations in Australia
Television networks in Australia
Television channels and stations established in 2019
Foxtel